Kemps Creek is a suburb of Sydney, in the state of New South Wales, Australia. It is part of the Greater Western Sydney region.

History
Kemps Creek is named after Anthony Fenn Kemp (1773–1868), who was granted two adjoining properties in this district. The other was  granted in 1820 and named Mount Vernon. A school was established in 1885 called Exeter Farm School after the large property subdivision in neighbouring Badgerys Creek but the name was changed a few years later to Kemps Creek Public School.

Kemps Creek Post Office opened on 27 March 1925.

Population
In the 2016 Census, there were 2,268 people in Kemps Creek. 60.9% of people were born in Australia. The next most common country of birth was Italy at  6.5%. 50.0% of people spoke only English at home. Other languages spoken at home included Italian 10.1% and Arabic 6.4%. The most common responses for religion were Catholic 46.1% and No Religion 13.2%.

Commercial area
Elizabeth Drive runs through the suburb horizontally, and on it are the Rural Fire Service, petrol stations, cafes, telephone, post office and Bill Anderson Park, which has a playground and toilet facilities. The Kemps Creek commercial area is also now home to the new Animal Welfare League NSW shelter that rehomes surrendered and abandoned animals plus offer pet boarding.

Geography
The suburb is bound to the west by South Creek, and to the south-east by Kemps Creek. A number of reservoirs dot the landscape. The Kemps Creek Memorial Park is located on Western Road. The southern border is Fifteenth Avenue. To the north Mamre Road runs from south-east to north-west through the suburb. Kemps Creek flows into the main reservoir and then joins South Creek. The Mills Cross, a radio telescope, is situated between South Creek and the main reservoir, near Argus Technologies. The University of Sydney runs the Fleurs Radio Observatory and Fleurs Farm sites. Industry is present in such forms as Roladuct. In the far north of the suburb Ropes Creek flows in the north-west in a south-north direction and in the north-west, west of Mamre Road, is Cosgrove Hill. The northern boundary is the Sydney Water Supply Pipeline which goes from Prospect Reservoir to the west.

Transport
The suburb of Kemps Creek is connected by the Westlink M7 Motorway.

Schools
Kemps Creek has five schools, Kemps Creek Public School, Christadelphian Heritage College Sydney both located on Cross Street, and Mamre Anglican School, Trinity Catholic Primary School and Emmaus Catholic College located on Bakers Lane to the north.

References

External links
 Penrith Local Suburb Profile
 Christadelphian Heritage College Sydney

Brick

Suburbs of Sydney
City of Liverpool (New South Wales)
City of Penrith